This is a disambiguation page. The Connacht Senior League may refer to:
 
 Connacht Senior League (rugby union)   
 Connacht Senior League (association football)